Fågel Roc is a music collective founded in 2006 by the Swedish guitarist Petter Brundell. It has members from all over the planet and is based in Stockholm, Sweden. The name Fågel Roc / Bird Roc comes from the mythological gigantic bird Roc mentioned in the Thousand and one Nights and Sinbad myths.
Fågel Roc is called "The Swedish Band from all over the World" and "The Band without Borders", and has through the years included musicians from Sweden, Iraq, Brazil, Finland, Hungary, Uruguay, Kurdistan, Iran, Serbia, Afghanistan, Mexico, Palestine and Chile.

The music is a mix of the cultures from the people involved in the band and is often referred to as world music and is heavily influenced by Arab pop music, Swedish Folk music and music from the Balkans including such countries as Greece and Turkey. Scales frequently used are Hijaz-Nahawand and Bayati maqam. Fågel Roc labels it "Oriental melodies on a New Beat" or Mishmash music.

Lyrics are mainly in the Swedish language but also include Arabic, Assyrian, Chaldean, Finnish, and some French, Spanish and Portuguese.
The tunes are mainly written by the collective Fågel Roc but there are also covers of Arabic pop hits such as Ya nour el ain by Amr Diab, and songs by Fairuz, Shareen and Swedish folk tunes such as "Uti vår hage" and the Swedish National Anthem "Du gamla, du fria" and its medieval origin Kärestans död / Uti Tolvmilanskog.

Main musicians who have worked with the band 

 Nadia Louis - Vocals.
 Maia Saskia - Vocals.
 Petter Brundell - Acoustic synth guitar.
 Lars Tillberg Galsgaard - Pandeiro, Percussion, Vocals.
 Istvan Stenberg - Guitar, Bass.
 Dan Wistedt - Keyboards, Banjo, Melodica, Ocarina, Vocals.
 Michael Kjell - Bass.
 Rebin Musica - Woodwinds.
 Khaled Bright - Saxophone, Zurna.
 Ikram Gorges - Violin, Oud.
 Mia Berndes - Vocals.
 Enis Bibezic - Keyboards.
 Mohamed Lafta - Darbouka, Riq.
 Fidel Velasquez - Darbouka, Cajón.
 Michel Reisler -  Zabumba, Percussion.
 Marcelo Muñoz - Cajón.
 Lo Brundell - Cajón, Pandeiro.
 Shakir - Tablas.
 Pedro Martinez - Cajon, Percussion.
 Tarik Yas - Darbouka.
 Fadi Melko - Darbouka.

Discography 
 2007 - Kropp & Själ (Body & Soul).
 2009 - Uti Tolvmilanskog / Du gamla, du fria. - EP.
 2009 - Dans & Dröm (Dance & Dream). - Remix album.
 2010 - Mokhebi / Habibi Ya Nour el Ain ( حبيبي يا نور العين)- Single.
 2010 - 3xfilm - Soundtrack album with music from the films "Tal till Nationen (om den finns).", "Under a Layer of Snow." and "All as One – One as All.".
 2011 - Lek din Lek (Play your Game).
 2011 - Nomads Istanbul - Compilation album with Amr Diab, Natacha Atlas, Alabina and others on Turkish record company Yeni Dünya Muzik.
 2012 - Shata Khata (A New Year) - Single.
 2012 - Roc Guitar Solo.
 2012 - Musiken Moseca La Musica (The Music - الموسيقى) - Single.
 2013 - Musiken Moseca La Musica (The Music - الموسيقى) - Album.
 2014 - The Radio Edits.
 2014 - Salma ya Salama (Arabic version).
 2014 - Salma ya Salama (Assyrian version).
 2014 - Salma ya Salama (Version Française).
 2015 - Kärleken (Naci en Alamo / To Traoudi Ton Gyfton). - Single.
 2016 - Lyckan (The Happiness).
 2017 - Recycle & Remix. - Remix album.
 2018 - Sista Sommaren (The Final Summer)
 2019 - From Stockholm with Love - Cover album.
 2020 - Horisonten (The Horizon).
 2022 - Elektrik Polyglot Akustik.

Film 
 Speech to the Nation (if it exists). - Documentary for Swedish TV4.
 Under a Layer of Snow. - Movie Theatre Documentary.
 One as All / All as One. - Documentary for Swedish TV1. (SVT1). Part 1 Part 2
 The Great Liberty. - Movie Theatre Documentary.
 Displaced Persons. - Movie Theatre Documentary.
 KulturÅttan (Opening sequence) - Cultural magazine for Swedish TV8
 Film music for different companies working with solar energy and ecological, sustainable living.
  Ingen Ängel. For Swedish TV!

Radio 
 Swedish Radio Interview (Swedish)

References

External links 
 Official website
 Swedish Film Database.
 Sveriges Arkiv över Musiklänkar (SAM).

2006 establishments in Sweden
Musical groups established in 2006
Swedish musical groups
Roc (mythology)
Organizations based in Stockholm